Fair Warning may refer to:

Music 
 "Fair Warning", a 1975 song by Todd Rundgren from Initiation
 Fair Warning (Van Halen album), a 1981 album by Van Halen
 Fair Warning (band), a German hard rock band founded in 1991
 Fair Warning (Fair Warning album), a 1992 album by Fair Warning
 Fair Warning, a 2014 album by The Rails

Other media 
 Fair Warning (1931 film), a 1931 American film starring George O'Brien
 Fair Warning (1937 film), a 1937 American mystery film
 "Fair Warning" (The Twilight Zone), an episode of the 2002 revival of The Twilight Zone
 Fair Warning, a 2002 novel by Robert Olen Butler, or the 2001 short story expanded for the novel
 Fair Warning, a 2020 novel by Michael Connelly

See also 
 Warning (disambiguation)